Ombigaichen is a mountain in the Himalaya of eastern Nepal. Its summit is 6,340 m above sealevel.

Mountains of Koshi Province
Six-thousanders of the Himalayas